Arena Multiuso is a planned multi-use stadium in Salvador, Brazil. Once built, it will be used mostly for football matches and will host the homes matches of Esporte Clube Vitória.  The stadium will have a capacity of 30,000 people.  It replaces their current stadium Barradão.

External links
EC Vitória Official Website

Proposed stadiums
Multiuso
Esporte Clube Vitória
Sports venues in Salvador, Bahia